The Jodcast is a bimonthly podcast created by astronomers at Jodrell Bank Centre for Astrophysics (JBCA), University of Manchester in Manchester, England. It debuted in January 2006, aiming to inspire and inform the public about astronomy and related sciences, to excite young people with the latest astronomy research results, to motivate students to pursue careers in science, and to dispel stereotypes of scientists as incomprehensible and unapproachable.

The Jodcast provides insight into up-to-date astronomical and astrophysical research via regular interviews with researchers from institutions worldwide, as well as with its own staff at the University of Manchester. Its regular Night's Sky segment provides an overview of sights in Northern and Southern hemisphere's night skies for amateur astronomers on a month-by-month basis, and it also regularly interacts with listeners and answers questions related to astronomy and astrophysics during its monthly Ask an Astronomer segments.

The Jodcast was co-founded by previous Manchester students Stuart Lowe, Nick Rattenbury and David Ault in 2006. Its current executive producers are Manchester PhD students Tiaan Bezuidenhout, Fiona Porter, and Michael Wright. Current and previous episodes of the Jodcast may be downloaded via its own website and RSS feeds, and from iTunes. The Jodcast is also regularly collated and integrated into various Internet-based astronomy radio shows.

Format

Two episodes of the Jodcast are released every month: one regular episode released towards the beginning of the month, and one Extra Episode released halfway through the month. These two episodes have different formats and include regular features such as: interviews with prominent forefront researchers in astronomy and astrophysics; monthly overviews of sights in the night sky for amateur astronomers in both the Northern and Southern hemispheres; and Ask an Astronomer, where listener questions are answered by staff at Jodrell Bank Observatory (JBO).

Regular Episodes
Each Jodcast episode features three presenters who introduce upcoming show segments, discuss listener feedback and provide commentary on topics mentioned on each episode. An Odd and End segment is also provided by the episode's presenters, where current topical news articles and research papers (often of a humorous nature) are discussed.

The Jodcast News is the first segment featured during each regular episode. It compiles current astronomy-related affairs and research gathered from existing media, such as print journals, web press releases and news sites into a short (<10 minutes) segment.

Each episode of the Jodcast features an extended interview with a visitor to JBCA/JBO. Visitors are usually academics who discuss their current research topics related to astronomy, space science or astrophysics. As visitors are often at JBCA/JBO to present research, collaborate with colleagues, or attend conferences or events such as BBC Stargazing Live, Jodcast interviews cover the most current and exciting topics in astronomy including: gravitational waves, pulsar astronomy, black holes, exoplanets, and the hunt for extraterrestrial life. The Jodcast routinely features interviews with extremely prominent figures.

The Night Sky section is a monthly segment for amateur astronomers focusing on the objects which may be seen in the Northern hemisphere night sky with the unaided eye, or affordable equipment each month. It has been written and narrated by former president of the Society for Popular Astronomy, Ian Morison since its inception. Following requests from listeners, the Jodcast also began a Southern hemisphere night sky section, which is written and produced by astronomers at Space Place at Carter Observatory in Wellington, New Zealand.

Extra Episodes
During mid-month Extra Episodes the Jodcast replaces its News and Night Sky segments with Ask an Astronomer and Jodbite segments.

The Ask an Astronomer segment of the Jodcast features questions provided by listeners and answered by various JBCA/JBO astronomers. Questions are collected via the Jodcast website's feedback page through letters and postcards, and from the Jodcast's various social media outlets. Questions are then carefully collated and researched, before being answered on the show. Frequently questions regard items previously featured on the show, and current affairs from the wider world of science.

Jodbite segments follow the same format as regular episode's interviews, except for their shorter duration and focus on the work of current JBCA/JBO staff and researchers.

Special Episodes
In accordance with its aim to educate a worldwide audience on current important astronomy-related affairs, the Jodcast often creates special episodes dedicated to astronomy-related conferences such as the UK Royal Astronomical Society National Astronomy Meeting, and International Astronomical Union General Assemblies, complete with interviews and material obtained live on-site. Other special episodes include: live episode with studio audiences in 2009 and 2016; and various video episodes featuring on-site tours of telescopes such as e-MERLIN and LOFAR.

Notable interviews
Interviews with astronomers external to Manchester University are a regular feature on the Jodcast, and cover a diverse range of astronomical and astrophysical topics. Prominent figures in astronomy and astrophysics have often appeared as guests on the Jodcast including: Sir Bernard Lovell, a key figure in the establishment of Jodrell Bank Observatory; discoverer of pulsars, Dame Jocelyn Bell Burnell; and astronaut, Buzz Aldrin. A list of notable Jodcast interviews is provided below.

Funding
The Jodcast has been funded by the Particle Physics and Astronomy Research Council, the British Institute of Physics, and the Science and Technology Facilities Council.

Related Podcasts 
The Jodcast team has previously contributed to notable podcasts such as 365 Days of Astronomy and BBC Radio 5 Live's Outriders.  Team members are regular contributors to BBC Radio 5 Live's Up All Night with Rhod Sharp.  It collates and maintains a list of radio shows and podcasts on topics related to the fields of astronomy, astrophysics and space science for educational purposes.

See also

 Astronomy Cast
 Planetary Radio
 Universe Today
 NASAcast

References

Astronomy education podcasts
Audio podcasts
Video podcasts
2006 podcast debuts